Mendota Unified School District is a public school district based in Fresno County, California, United States.

Schools
 Mendota High School
 Mendota Junior High School
 Washington Elementary School
 Mendota Elementary School
 McCabe Elementary School
 Mendota Alternative Education

References

External links
 

School districts in Fresno County, California
1893 establishments in California
School districts established in 1893